M+NetMail  was an ISP-grade E-mail package by Messaging Architects. It was designed to deliver scalable messaging and calendaring services, using Internet-standard protocols (e.g. IMAP, iCalendar, POP, SMTP), across a large enterprise, or to a large group of users who are not particularly associated (for example, the user population of a typical ISP). The original name for the product, when owned by Novell, was Novell Internet Messaging System (NIMS). Messaging Architects showcased NetMail on its MyRealBox website, this service was discontinued on June 1, 2011.

In late February 2007, Novell sold the Netmail source code and brand name to Messaging Architects, which has since release a new version. This new version came with several long-awaited fixes along with a new "web 2.0" web mail client.

Since 2014  uses the brand name to deliver software solution. Netmail EMEA is as a formally subsidiary from Messaging Architects (called later Netmail/NetGovern) and now part of Ipro Tech.

Positioning
NetMail is not designed as a group collaboration software, such as Novell GroupWise, IBM Lotus Notes / Domino, or Microsoft Exchange Server. It is not positioned to compete with those products.

Design
M+NetMail is designed around open standards, including LDAP, PKCS, iCal, POP3, IMAP4, SSL, and S/MIME. Because it is standards-based, there is no "native" client. It instead works with any standards-based IMAP4, POP3 or iCal client. The web interface is likewise usable by most web browsers.

Platforms
M+NetMail's server components run atop a variety of platforms, letting the NetMail customer choose the platform most appropriate to their environment. In contrast, some competing products attempt to lock their customers into a single platform. NetMail components are available for SUSE and Red Hat Linux, Novell NetWare v5.1 and later, Novell Open Enterprise Server (in both its OES-Linux and OES-NetWare versions), and Microsoft Windows platforms.

See also
Bongo (software)

References

External links
Messaging Architects Home Page

Groupware
Message transfer agents
Novell software